Sean Henderson (born July 25, 1972 in Everett, Washington) is a retired American soccer midfielder who spent two seasons in Germany, three in Major League Soccer and five in the USL A-League.  He is now the scouting director for Seattle Sounders FC.

Player

Youth
Henderson, younger brother to Chris Henderson, was born and raised in Everett, Washington, attending Cascade High School where he was a two-time high school All American and helped the Bruins win the state championship in 1987 and 1989. After high school, he attended UCLA where he played from 1990 to 1993. In his first year at UCLA, they won the NCAA National Championship. In 1993, he was named captain, selected as an All American and was voted as the team Offensive MVP. In 1991, Henderson was a member of the North Huntington Beach Untouchables that won the U19 National Championship.

Professional
In 1994, Henderson turned professional with the East Los Angeles Cobras in the USISL.  That fall, he moved to Germany and signed with Regionalliga club TuS Celle.  In 1996, he returned to the United States and signed with the Colorado Rapids of Major League Soccer, playing alongside his brother.  In 1997, the Rapids went to the MLS championship game where it lost to D.C. United. San Jose Earthquakes picked up Henderson in the waiver draft but failed to earn a roster spot for the 1999 season. He appears in the 99 media guide and program until June 1999. On June 30, 1999, Henderson moved to the second division Seattle Sounders of the USL A-League.  He played there until retiring from professional soccer in 2005.

U-20 National Team
Henderson made five appearances with the United States U-20 men's national soccer team.

Coach
Henderson joined Crossfire Premier, a youth club based in Redmond, Washington, in 1999.
Henderson joined the Seattle Sounders FC Academy for their inaugural season in 2010. After 8 years as an academy coach he became the Director of Scouting for Sounders in 2018. Henderson holds his US Soccer A License and the Elite Formation License from the French Soccer Federation

References

External links

 Crossfire Premier coaching profile

1972 births
Living people
American soccer players
American expatriate soccer players
UCLA Bruins men's soccer players
TuS Celle FC players
Colorado Rapids players
Seattle Sounders (1994–2008) players
Expatriate footballers in Germany
Soccer players from Washington (state)
Major League Soccer players
USISL players
A-League (1995–2004) players
United States men's under-20 international soccer players
Seattle Sounders FC non-playing staff
Association football midfielders